Gannin Duane Arnold is an American musician who is a producer, songwriter, and composer of Christian and secular music. Arnold is a multi-instrumental session musician as well as the lead guitarist of the band Taylor Hawkins and the Coattail Riders and The Jimmy Chamberlin Complex. He has received two GMA Dove Awards for his production work. Gannin also toured with Joe Walsh from 2007 to 2017 and co-wrote his most recent single, "Analog Man." He's also had a long standing working relationship with Simon Fuller (creator of American Idol/Spice Girls) writing and producing songs for many of his various projects including "Now United." He's also had recent success in the K-Pop world working with "Twice" and "Shinee" which has earned him two Gold records.

In the early 2000's Gannin began working on projects for Disney. He's produced and written underscore for their Karaoke series which has featured "Frozen 1 and 2, Encanto, Wreck It Ralph, The Princess and The Frog, Moana, Beauty and The Beast" among many others. He also written and produced songs for their hit TV shows "Austin and Ally" and "Live and Maddie."  

Gannin co-wrote the theme song for The Jeff Probst Show, which aired on NBC from September 2012 to September 2013.

Early life
Arnold was born Gannin Arnold on October 7, 1971, in Los Angeles, California.

Music career
Arnold's music production and songwriting career commenced around 1994. He won the GMA Dove Award for Rock/Contemporary Album of the Year in 2013 for A Messenger by Colton Dixon, with his fellow producers Adam Watts and Andy Dodd of Red Decibel Music Group, and again in 2015 for his production work on Anchor by Colton Dixon.

In 2010, he released his first solo album, Not From Here.

Discography

Bill Madden
 Samsara's Grip (2004)

Jeremy Camp
 Carried Me (Certified Gold) (2004)

John Tesh
 Live Worship At Red Rocks (2004)

with Taylor Hawkins and the Coattail Riders
 Taylor Hawkins and the Coattail Riders (2006)
 Red Light Fever (2010)
 Get The Money (2019)

with Jeff BerlinAneurythms (2006)

Solo
 Not From Here (2010)

The Avengers Soundtrack
 The Avengers Soundtrack Cherri Bomb Shake The Ground (2012)

with Cherri Bomb
 This Is The End Of Control (2012)

Austin and Ally
 Parachute (2013)

Joe Walsh
 Analog Man (2012)

Liv and Maddie
 As Long As I Have You (2013)

Colton Dixon
 A Messenger (2013)
 Anchor (2014)
 Identity (2017)

with Hey Violet
 I Can Feel It (2015)

with Shinee
 The Story Of Light EP2 (certified gold) (2018)

with Showtek and Moti featuring Wycleaf Jean and Starley
 Down Easy (2018)

Now United
 Afraid of Letting Go (2019)
 Beautiful Life (2019)
 Live This Moment (2020)
 Dana Dana (2020)
 When You Love Somebody (2021)
 Ikou (2021)
 We Got Good Days (2021)
 Like Me (2022)
 Cotton Candy (2023)
 Find Your Fire (2023)

Twice
 &Twice (certified platinum) (2019)

Mark Owen
 Are You Looking For Billy?'' (2022)

References

External links
 Facebook page
 Twitter page

1971 births
Living people
Christians from California
Record producers from California
Musicians from Los Angeles
Songwriters from California
People from Los Angeles